= Kelanting =

The kelanting is a traditional Indonesian snack made from cassava that has been crushed, seasoned, and subsequently fried.
